JCPS can refer to:
 Jersey City Public Schools
 Jefferson County Public Schools (disambiguation), various school systems
 Joint Center for Political and Economic Studies, a national nonprofit American research and public policy institution